Jeevan Ki Shatranj is a 1993 Indian Hindi-language film directed by S. A. Chandrasekhar, starring Mithun Chakraborty, Farah, Shilpa Shirodkar. The movie is a remake of director's own 1989 Tamil movie Rajanadai.

Plot
Jeevan Ki Shatranj is the story of an honest CID Inspector Vijay who has been assigned to nab the killers of the commissioner, but he has his own family problems, as his wife is suffering from a serious disease. Vijay collects evidences against the killers but that goes missing.

Cast
Mithun Chakraborty as CID Inspector Vijay Sharma
Farah as Radha Sharma
Shilpa Shirodkar as CID Inspector Kiran
Deepak Tijori as Amar
Aruna Irani as Police Inspector
Kader Khan as Police Constable 
Kiran Kumar as Black Dogra
Avtar Gill as ACP Ashwini Kamble
Goga Kapoor as IGP
Tej Sapru as Babu
Mahavir Shah as Tony

Soundtrack
Sameer wrote all songs.

Reception
The film is a remake of the Tamil film Rajanadai, starring Vijayakanth.

References

External links
 

1993 films
1990s Hindi-language films
Films scored by Anand–Milind
Mithun's Dream Factory films
Films shot in Ooty
Films directed by S. A. Chandrasekhar